The 2011 season was Seongnam Ilhwa Chunma's twenty-third season in the K-League in South Korea. Seongnam Ilhwa Chunma was competing in K-League, League Cup and Korean FA Cup.

Current squad

Match results

K-League

League table

Results summary

Results by round

Korean FA Cup

League Cup

Squad statistics

Appearances and goals
Statistics accurate as of match played 30 October 2011

Top scorers

Top assistors

Discipline

Transfer

In
 14 July 2011 –  Lee Chang-Hoon – Gangwon FC
 14 July 2011 –  Héverton – Portuguesa (loan)
 21 September 2011 –  Kim Jung-Woo – Sangju Sangmu Phoenix (return from army)

Out
 7 July 2011 –  Jean Carlos – Free Agent
 7 July 2011 –  Kim Jin-Yong – Gangwon FC
 July 2011 –  Lee Hyun-Woo – Free Agent

References

Seongnam Ilhwa Chunma
2011